Dun-le-Palestel is a commune in the Creuse department in the Nouvelle-Aquitaine region in central France.

Geography

Population

Sights
 The church of Notre-Dame, built between 1905 and 1908.
 The Lavoir of Dunet where the residents of the village washed their linens before the invention of the washing machine.
 The portal of the old church, dating from the thirteenth century.
 The war memorial.
 Vestiges of the moat of a castle.
 A dolmen known as the Pierre Eubeste, at La Valette.

See also
Communes of the Creuse department

References

External links

Official website of Dun-le-Palestel 

Communes of Creuse
County of La Marche